Germain Kambinga is a Congolese politician. He was elected as a member of the National Assembly in 2011. He serves as the Minister of Industry for the Democratic Republic of the Congo.

References

Living people
Government ministers of the Democratic Republic of the Congo
Year of birth missing (living people)
21st-century Democratic Republic of the Congo people